Montana Snowbowl is an alpine ski area in the western United States, located in the Lolo National Forest of western Montana,  northwest of Missoula. It is known for long expert runs such as West Bowl and its throwback operations; there is no significant base development, its two lifts are vintage Riblet double chairs; the access road is significantly improved as of 2011, but still unpaved.

Montana Snowbowl is also known for its steep runs and a  vertical rise. When the resort first opened in December 1962, it was promoted as having the most vertical in the Pacific Northwest.

Geography
Montana Snowbowl's base is centered on Butler Creek, a tributary of the Clark Fork River west of Missoula. To the west of TV Mountain runs La Valle Creek, which is also tributary to the Clark Fork River.

Access to the Montana Snowbowl begins at exit 101 of Interstate 90 on Grant Creek Road which parallels Grant Creek, one valley to the east from Butler Creek. Grant Creek's source is on the west flank of Murphy Peak (which is just north of Point Six Peak).

Park Expansion
In the spring of 2011, the area and the Lolo National Forest released plans to greatly expand the area by adding several chairlifts, more parking, and a new mountain restaurant. Part of the expansion would be on to slopes on TV Mountain which were home to the original Snow Park ski area, but later abandoned. The Snow Park expansion opened in January 2020. 

The ski area often opens with weekend skiing in early December, with more regular lift operations in mid-December and extending into the new year. From late June to early September the area operates one lift on the weekends for hikers and downhill mountain bikers.

References

External links
 

Buildings and structures in Missoula County, Montana
Ski areas and resorts in Montana
Tourist attractions in Missoula County, Montana
Missoula, Montana